Mattias Rönngren (born 22 November 1993) is a Swedish World Cup alpine ski racer.

At the 2021 World Championships, he was part of the mixed team that earned a silver medal for Sweden in the team event.

World Cup results

Season standings

World Championship results

Olympic results

References

External links

1993 births
Living people
Swedish male alpine skiers
People from Åre Municipality
Alpine skiers at the 2022 Winter Olympics
Olympic alpine skiers of Sweden
Sportspeople from Jämtland County
21st-century Swedish people